Carlos Elejalde Garay (born 10 October 1960) better known as Karra Elejalde, is a Spanish actor and occasional filmmaker.

Biography 
Carlos Elejalde Garay was born on 10 October 1960 in Vitoria-Gasteiz. He developed his early acting career on independent stage plays.

After making his feature film debut with a role in the 1987 film A los cuatro vientos, Elejalde's collaborations with Basque cinema auteurs such as Juanma Bajo Ulloa, Álex de la Iglesia or Julio Medem launched his acting career in the 1990s.

He made his feature film directorial debut by shooting the 2000 film Año Mariano in tandem with Fernando Guillén Cuervo, later making his solo debut with the 2004 film Torapia.

In 2014 he replaced Benito Pocino as Mortadelo in Mortadelo y Filemón contra Jimmy el Cachondo (2014). He played Koldo in Ocho apellidos vascos. He reprised the same role in Ocho apellidos catalanes (2015). After the success of both films, he affirmed he won't play the next sequels. In 2016 he appeared in 1898: Los últimos de Filipinas as Brother Carmelo.

During the 25th Goya Awards in 2011 he was awarded by the Goya Award for Best Supporting Actor. In 2015 he was awarded by the same prize at the 29th Goya Awards.

Selected filmography

1987: A los cuatro vientos
1990: Sauna as Johnny
1991: Butterfly Wings as Neighbour
1992: Vacas as Ilegorri / Lucas
1993: Acción mutante as José Óscar 'Manitas' Tellería
1993: The Red Squirrel as Antón
1993: La madre muerta as Ismael López de Matauko
1993: Kika as Policía
1994: Dias contados as Rafa
1994: Enciende mi pasión as Nruno
1995: Salto al vacío as Juancar
1995: Entre rojas as Padre de Lucía
1995: Adão e Eva as Rafael
1995: Tatiana, la muñeca rusa as Gianni
1996: Earth as Patricio
1996: El dedo en la llaga as Eduardo
1996: Corsarios del chip as Roberto Mesa
1996: Best Seller (El Premio) as Sergio
1997: Airbag as Juantxo
1997: La pistola de mi hermano as Inspector
1999: A Sweet Scent of Death as El Gitano
1999: Novios as José
1999: The Nameless as Massera
2000: Año Mariano as Mariano
2001: Lázaro de Tormes as Arcipreste
2001: Killer Housewives as Lalo
2001: Visionarios as Laburu
2001: Carne de gallina as Gelín
2002: El rey de la granja
2002: Nos miran as Medina
2002: The Forest as Velasco
2004: Torapia as Basilio
2005: El calentito as Pepe
2006: Locos por el sexo as Ramón
2007: Timecrimes as Héctor
2008: Íntimos y extraños. 3 historias y 1/2 as Diego
2010: El idioma imposible as Camarero
2010: Biutiful as Mendoza
2010: Even the Rain as Antón / Colón
2012: Miel de naranjas as Don Eladio
2012: Invader as Baza
2014: Ocho apellidos vascos as Koldo
2014: A esmorga as Bocas
2014: Mortadelo and Filemon: Mission Implausible as Mortadelo / Tía Fulgencia (voice)
2015: Rey Gitano as Josemari
2015: Ocho apellidos catalanes as Koldo
2016: Embarazados as Ginecólogo
2016: Rumbos as Pedro
2016: 100 Meters as Manolo
2016: 1898, Our Last Men in the Philippines as Fray Carmelo
2017: Operación Concha as Marcos Ruiz de Aldazábal
2017: La higuera de los bastardos as Rogelio
2017: Santo Time as Munilla
2019: La pequeña Suiza as Peio
2019: While at War as Miguel de Unamuno
2021: Below Zero as Miguel
 2021: Polyamory for Dummies as Satur
2022: What Lucía Saw as Ignacio Ellacuría
 2022: La vida padre as Juan
 2022: Vasil as Alfredo
 2022: The Three Wise Kings vs Santa
TBA: Kepler Sexto B

Accolades

References

External links 

 

1960 births
Living people
Spanish male film actors
People from Vitoria-Gasteiz
Best Supporting Actor Goya Award winners
20th-century Spanish male actors
21st-century Spanish male actors
Male actors from the Basque Country (autonomous community)